Latin Mann (subtitled Afro to Bossa to Blues) is an album by American jazz flautist Herbie Mann recorded for the Columbia label and released in 1965. Mann's contract with Atlantic Records allowed him to record the album for another label.

Reception

AllMusic awarded the album 3 stars.

Track listing
 "Let's Boom Chitty Boom" (Herbie Mann) - 3:23
 "What'd I Say" (Ray Charles) - 4:59
 "Señor Blues" (Horace Silver) - 3:52
 "Bijou" (Ralph Burns) - 3:25
 "Jungle Fantasy" (Esy Morales) - 3:54
 "Watermelon Man" (Herbie Hancock) - 4:09
 "Interlude" (Pete Rugolo) - 4:14
 "The Jive Samba" (Nat Adderley) - 5:03
 "Ave Maria Morena" (Fausto Curbelo) - 4:36 	
 "Manteca" (Dizzy Gillespie, Chano Pozo, Gil Fuller) - 4:35 	
Recorded in New York City on June 1, 1965 (tracks 2, 4, 7 & 10), June 2, 1965 (tracks 1, 3, 6 & 8) and June 24, 1965 (tracks 5 & 9)

Personnel 
Herbie Mann - flute
Carmell Jones, Jerry Kail, Joe Newman, Ernie Royal - trumpet
John Hitchcock, Mark Weinstein - trombone
Quentin Jackson, Tony Studd - bass trombone
Danny Bank - bass clarinet
Jimmy Heath - tenor saxophone
Dave Pike - vibraphone
Chick Corea, Charlie Palmieri - piano
Earl May, Bobby Rodriguez - bass
Bruno Carr - drums
Carlos "Patato" Valdes - congas
José Mangual - bongos
Willie Bobo, Tommy Lopez, Willie Rodriguez, Carlos Diaz, Rafael De Vila, Raymond Sardinis - percussion
Oliver Nelson - arranger, conductor

References 

1965 albums
Herbie Mann albums
Albums produced by Tom Wilson (record producer)
Columbia Records albums
Albums arranged by Oliver Nelson